English is the official language of Guyana, which is the only South American country with English as the official language.

Guyanese Creole (an English-based creole with African, Indian, and Amerindian syntax) is widely spoken in Guyana.

Guyanese Hindustani is retained and spoken by some Indo-Guyanese for cultural and religious reasons. Guyanese Bhojpuri may be used by older generations, folk songs, or in a limited way at home, while standard Hindi is used in religious service, writing, and passively through the consumption of Hindi film exports from India.

A number of Amerindian languages are also spoken by a minority of the population.  These include Cariban languages such as Macushi, Akawaio and Wai-Wai; and Arawakan languages such as Arawak (or Lokono) and Wapishana.

Second and third languages 

Due to the growing presence of Cubans and Venezuelans in the country, Spanish is heard more and more frequently, especially in Georgetown and Region 1. Portuguese is increasingly being used as a second language in Guyana, particularly in the south of the country, bordering on Brazil. Spanish, Portuguese and French are taught in most secondary schools.

References

External links 
 Ethnologue list (map)